Marina Vladimirovna Fedorova (Russian: Марина Владимировна Фёдорова born 8 May  1981) is a Russian figurative artist and painter. Marina Fedorova’s artworks were nominated for the Kandinsky Prize.
Works by the artist are kept in the collections of the State Hermitage Museum and the State Russian Museum.

Biography 

Marina Fedorova was born on 8 May 1981 in the city of Leningrad, USSR. She began her professional career in 1996 after enrolling at the N.K. Roerich Art School in St. Petersburg (Leningrad was renamed Saint-Petersburg in 1991) from which she graduated in 2000.

In 2000, Fedorova entered the Stieglitz State Academy of Art and Design (formerly known as the Vera Mukhina Art School) where she majored in Fashion Design and Illustration. In 2006, at her first “open” (for the audience) diploma defense, she created a performance with almost naked models who walk on the podium holding canvases with painted dresses; the last dress the artist painted right on the stage.

Since 2001, the artist’s paintings have been to the cities of St. Petersburg, Moscow, Paris, Genoa, Malaga, and Helsinki.

She was a participant in many international art fairs: Art Stage Singapore, Art Moscow, Art Paris, Art Monaco, Art Bologna, Art Vilnius, Art Kyiv, and Art Helsinki, Art Marbella.

In 2007, Marina Fedorova took part in the XVII International Ballet Festival “MARIINSKY” as an official designer. She took part in a charity gala-auction supported by CHRISTIE’S at the State Russian Museum. The artist presented the exhibition “NY/NEW YOU” at the parallel program of the VI Moscow Biennale of Contemporary Art.

In 2020, the artist presented the Cosmodreams exhibition, where she supplements traditional painting with augmented reality elements. The Cosmodreams project embodies ideas of reflection on the cosmos and its invasion of the earthly glamour world.

In 2021, Marina Fedorova announced a joint project with the national postal operator Russian Post and the St. Petersburg Planetarium to commemorate the international Cosmonautics Day and Yuri’s Night celebrations. Throughout April, a limited edition postcard created for the 60th anniversary of the first human spaceflight and featuring an AR design based on one of the artist’s works, Sunset, will be available for postage.

Artistry 

Fedorova’s works reflect life in the modern metropolis with ordinary people as paintings heroes. The artist depicts everyday events and characters in familiar circumstances. Her style is characterized by characters’ idealization and demonstration of the beautiful in the ordinary.

Besides, a deliberate incompleteness characterizes the artist’s pictorial style. Often the characters and objects of her works seem to float in weightlessness. By mastering the painting’s space and “bringing it into focus,” both the gaze of the painting’s heroine and the thing emotionally “enlivened” by the author may be in the center of attention.

The same incompleteness is inherent in the plot of Fedorova’s paintings. The artist shows the viewer the climax of an event, more willingly depicting its anticipation or “aftertaste”.

American hyperrealism, pop art, and modernism influenced the artist’s work. Marina Fedorova draws inspiration from well-known contemporary artists, such as Alex Kanevsky, Eric Fischl, Alex Katz, and Georgia O’Keeffe.

Works 

Marina Fedorova’s works are on display at the Hermitage-Vyborg Center and D137 Gallery in St. Petersburg, Russia, as well as at the SONS museum in Kruishoutem, Belgium.

The artist’s paintings were acquired for the following private collections:

 Laurent Boutonnat Collection, France
 Nicolas Feuillatte Champagne House Collection, France
 Pierre Brochet Collection, France
 Matan Uziel Collection, Israel
 Ilya Lagutenko Collection, Russia
 Artemy Troitsky Collection, Estonia
 Victor Dzodziev Collection, Russia
 Mikhail Tsaryov Collection, Moscow Contemporary Art Collectors’ Club, Russia.

Art Fairs 

 2019 Art Marbella, Spain
 2017-18 Talented Art Fair London
 2013 Art Stage Singapore by LAZAREV GALLERY, Singapore
 2012 Art Moscow by LAZAREV GALLERY, Russia
 2012 Art Helsinki 2012 by Kadieff gallery, Finland
 2011 Art Helsinki 2011 by Kadieff gallery, Finland
 2010 Art Vilnus by D137 Gallery, Lithuania
 2008 Art Paris by Orel art Gallery, France
 2007 Art Moscow by D137 Gallery, Russia
 2006 Arte Fiere by D137 Gallery, Italy
 2006 Art Moscow by D137 Gallery, Russia
 2005 Art Moscow by D137 Gallery, Russia

Awards and honors 

 2008 The artist of a year of "Nicolas Feuillatte" Champagne, France
 2008 Kandinsky Prize nominee, Central house of artists, Moscow, Russia
 2007 Official painter of VII international ballet festival "MARIINSKY"

References

External links
 Megapolis live by Maria Fedorova
World of Fashion 2021

Modern painters
Russian women painters
Saint Petersburg Stieglitz State Academy of Art and Design alumni
21st-century Russian painters
Living people
Artists from Saint Petersburg
Year of birth missing (living people)